Waxy may refer to:

 a substance related to wax
 colloquially for a waxworm (particularly used by anglers)
 Waxy (band), an American stoner rock band
 Waxy (horse), a thoroughbred racehorse
 WAXY (AM), a radio station (790 AM) licensed to serve South Miami, Florida, United States
 WSFS (FM), a radio station (104.3 FM) licensed to serve Miramar, Florida, which held the call sign WAXY-FM from 2012 to 2015

Also 
 Waxy cap, a taxon of white-spored agarics
 Waxy corn, a maize variety found in China in 1909
 Waxy flexibility, a psychomotor symptom of catatonic schizophrenia
 Waxy monkey leaf frog, a frog species found in South and Central American
 Waxy potato starch, a new type of starch only containing amylopectin molecules
 Waxy skin, a cutaneous condition observed in roughly 50% of diabetic patients with longstanding disease

See also 
 Cereus (disambiguation), Cerea (disambiguation), waxy in Latin